Saçak is a town (belde) in the Çerkeş District, Çankırı Province, Turkey. Its population is 2,520 (2021).

References

Populated places in Çankırı Province
Çerkeş District